Beautiful Manasugalu ( Beautiful Minds) is a 2017 Indian Kannada-language romantic thriller film written and directed by Jayatheertha. Jointly funded by S. Prasanna and S. Shashikala Balaji, the film is produced under Skkandda Entertainment banner. It features Sathish Ninasam and Shruthi Hariharan, teaming up again after Lucia (2013), in the lead roles. The film score and soundtrack is composed by Bharath B. J.

The film was officially launched on 14 February 2015 coinciding the Valentines Day and was released across Karnataka on 20 January 2017. The film released to positive reviews.

Plot 
The movie follows the lives of Prashanth (Sathish Ninasam), an idler with well-to-do parents, and Nandini (Sruthi Hariharan) who is the sole breadwinner of her family of four. Prashanth falls in love with Nandini, who agrees to marry him only on the condition that he gives up his carefree ways and behaves responsibly. The couple's honeyed existence is abruptly cut short when police Inspector Kodanda (Achyuth Kumar) stages a raid on the beauty parlor Nandini was working at, proclaiming that sex-trade activities were being carried out there, and displays condom packets which were apparently found there as proof of the illegal activities being carried out there. Video clips of Nandini and her friend Ratna are circulated continuously on TV, leading to Ratna attempting suicide due to the immense emotional trauma. Prashanth is shell-shocked by the news and breaks up with Nandini without giving her a chance to explain herself.

It emerges later that the raid on the parlor was a fake, and was done so by the Inspector in order to take revenge against the parlor owner who had refused to give bribes to him. When clips of the Inspector planting condom packets surface on TV, Prashanth realizes his mistake and attempts to reconcile with Nandini, who  refuses to have anything more to do with him and tearfully berates him for trusting the media rather than the words of his fiancée. In order to win back Nandini's respect, Prashanth goes on a crusade against Inspector Kodanda, kidnapping his daughter Rachana. He demands that Kodanda publicly confess to his crime of demanding bribes, which led him to plot the parlor owner's downfall. Kodanda appears before the media and admits his wrongdoings, and apologizes to Nandini and Ratna for having destroyed their lives and careers for furthering his own greedy interests. In the midst of the conference, Rachana is freed by Prashanth, and  calls up her father, who rushes to the spot. Rachana is disgusted by the behaviour of her father, and refuses to talk to him anymore, and leaves after informing him that he as a father provided her with everything in the world, but failed to provide the one thing that mattered: a good example of honesty and truthfulness. Prashanth and Nandini reconcile, and their story is featured on the TV show Beautiful Manasugalu as the credits roll.

Cast
 Sathish Ninasam as Prashanth
 Shruthi Hariharan as Nandini
 Achyuth Kumar 
 Tabla Nani
 Prashanth Siddi
 Sandeep
 Manjunath Bilikere
 Radha Jayaram
 Manjayya
 Chanchala Bhat
 Meghashri

Production
The film was offered to Sathish Ninasam in 2012, before Jayatheertha completed his other film Tony. However, the actual filming commenced on 14 February 2015 in Vijayanagar, Bangalore.

Soundtrack
The music of the movie has been composed by Bharath B. J. Initially only one song was planned, however one more additional song was added along with two instrumental tracks.

References

External links
 
 

2017 films
2010s Kannada-language films
Indian romantic thriller films
2010s romantic thriller films
Films directed by Jayatheertha